The Hungary men's national under-21 volleyball team represents Hungary in international men's volleyball competitions and friendly matches under the age 21 and it is ruled by the Hungarian Volleyball Federation body that is an affiliate of the Federation of International Volleyball FIVB and also part of the European Volleyball Confederation CEV.

Results

FIVB U21 World Championship
 Champions   Runners up   Third place   Fourth place

Team

Current squad
The following players are the Hungarian players that have competed in the 2018 Men's U20 Volleyball European Championship

References

External links
 Hungarian Volleyball Federation

National men's under-21 volleyball teams
Volleyball
Volleyball in Hungary